James "Gerbs" Bauer (born 1968, Michigan, USA) is an American astronomer who studies comets and related bodies. He was the first to quantify the seasonal surface changes on Neptune's moon Triton. He also observed the aftermath of the Deep Impact probe's collision with comet Tempel 1.
Currently, he is the deputy PI of the Wide-field Infrared Survey Explorer mission. His analysis of the images of comet Hartley 2 taken by the WISE spacecraft revealed that the object was shedding mass.
The asteroid 16232 Chijagerbs is named after him and his wife, Chija Bauer. They have one daughter and one son.

References 

http://scitechdaily.com/astronomers-reveal-the-true-identity-of-mysterious-centaurs/
http://www.space.com/18364-comet-breakup-inner-solar-system.html
https://web.archive.org/web/20150524233040/http://scaapt.org/meetings/2013mtg1spr/report.pdf

1968 births
Living people
American astronomers
Discoverers of minor planets